Richard Russo (July 15, 1949) is an American novelist, short story writer, screenwriter, and teacher.

Early life and education
Russo was born in Johnstown, New York, and raised in nearby Gloversville. He earned a bachelor's degree, a Master of Fine Arts degree, and a Doctor of Philosophy degree from the University of Arizona, which he attended from 1967 through 1979. The subject of his doctoral dissertation was the works of the early American writer, historian and editor Charles Brockden Brown.

Career
Russo was teaching in the English department at Southern Illinois University Carbondale when his first novel, Mohawk, was published, in 1986. Much of his work is semi-autobiographical, drawing on his life from his upbringing in upstate New York to his time teaching literature at Colby College (subsequently retired).

His 2001 novel Empire Falls received the 2002 Pulitzer Prize for Fiction. He has written seven other novels, a collection of short stories, and a memoir (Elsewhere). His short story "Horseman" was published in The Best American Short Stories 2007 edited by Stephen King and Heidi Pitlor.

Director Robert Benton adapted Russo's 1993 novel Nobody's Fool as a 1994 film of the same title, starring Paul Newman, which Benton directed. Benton and Russo co-wrote the 1998 film Twilight, also starring Newman. Russo wrote the teleplay for the HBO adaptation of Empire Falls, the screenplay for the 2005 film Ice Harvest, and the screenplay for the 2005 Niall Johnson film Keeping Mum, which starred Rowan Atkinson.

Personal life
Russo and his wife, Barbara, live in Portland, Maine, and spend winters in Boston. They have two daughters, Kate and Emily.

Works 
 Mohawk (Vintage Books, 1986)
 The Risk Pool (Random House, 1988)
 Nobody's Fool (Random House, 1993)
 Straight Man (Random House, 1997)
 Empire Falls (Alfred A. Knopf, 2001)
 The Whore's Child and Other Stories (Alfred A. Knopf, 2002)
 Bridge of Sighs (Alfred A. Knopf, 2007)
 That Old Cape Magic (Alfred A. Knopf, 2009)
 Interventions, with illustrator Kate Russo (Down East Books, 2012)
 Elsewhere: A Memoir (Alfred A. Knopf, 2012)
 Everybody's Fool (Alfred A. Knopf, May 3, 2016)
 Trajectory: Stories (Alfred A. Knopf, 2017)
 The Destiny Thief: Essays on Writing, Writers and Life (Alfred A. Knopf, 2018)
 Chances Are... (Alfred A. Knopf, 2019)
 Sh*tshow (Vintage, 2020)
 Marriage Story, An American Memoir (Scribd, 2021)
 Somebody's Fool (2023)

Filmography
Monsters (1989) (TV)
Nobody's Fool (1994) (based on his novel)
Twilight (with Robert Benton) (1998)
The Flamingo Rising (2001) (TV)
Brush with Fate (2003) (TV)
Empire Falls (2005) (TV)
The Ice Harvest (with Robert Benton) (2005)
Keeping Mum (with Niall Johnson) (2005)

References

External links

Audio recording of Russo reading a chapter of That Old Cape Magic from the Maine Humanities Council and the Portland Public Library

1949 births
Living people
20th-century American novelists
21st-century American novelists
American male novelists
American male screenwriters
Colby College faculty
People from Johnstown, New York
People from Camden, Maine
Pulitzer Prize for Fiction winners
Southern Illinois University faculty
University of Arizona alumni
Novelists from Maine
American male short story writers
People from Gloversville, New York
20th-century American short story writers
21st-century American short story writers
20th-century American male writers
21st-century American male writers
Novelists from New York (state)
Novelists from Illinois
Screenwriters from New York (state)
Screenwriters from Illinois
Screenwriters from Arizona
Screenwriters from Maine